Hollywood Heartbreakers is a 1985 pornographic film featuring Amber Lynn, Beverly Bliss, Gina Valentino, Nicole West, Traci Lords, Craig Roberts, David Sanders, Greg Rome, Rick Savage, Peter North, Tony Martino and Ron Jeremy.

Scene Breakdown

External links 

 

1985 films
1980s pornographic films